A genital tubercle or phallic tubercle is a body of tissue present in the development of the reproductive system. It forms in the ventral, caudal region of mammalian embryos of both sexes, and eventually develops into a primordial phallus. In the human fetus, the genital tubercle develops around week 4 of gestation, and by week 9 becomes recognizably either a clitoris or penis. This should not be confused with the sinus tubercle which is a proliferation of endoderm induced by paramesonephric ducts. Even after the phallus is developed, the term genital tubercle remains, but only as the terminal end of it, which develops into either the glans penis or the glans clitoridis.

In the development of the male fetus, the two sides of the tubercle approach ventrally forming a hollow tube that encloses the male urethra. The two glans wings merge in the midline forming the septum glandis. In the female fetus, the tubercle is attached to the vestibular folds that remain unfused forming the labia minora and the vaginal vestibule in between. The genital tubercle is sensitive to dihydrotestosterone and rich in 5-alpha-reductase, so that the amount of fetal testosterone present after the second month is a major determinant of phallus size at birth.

See also
Sexual differentiation

References

External links
 
 Overview at mcgill.ca

Embryology of urogenital system